KRKZ may refer to:

 KRKZ-FM, a radio station (94.3 FM) licensed to Netarts, Oregon, United States
 KFKB, a defunct radio station (1490 AM) licensed to Forks, Washington, United States, which held the call sign KRKZ from 2011 to 2012